North Kesteven is a local government district in Lincolnshire, England. The district is located to the east of Nottinghamshire, north-east of Leicestershire and south of the city of Lincoln. Its council, North Kesteven District Council, is based in Sleaford in the former offices of Kesteven County Council. Notable towns and villages in the district include Cranwell, Metheringham, North Hykeham, Sleaford and Waddington.

History
The district was formed on 1 April 1974, under the Local Government Act 1972. It was a merger of the previous urban district of Sleaford, along with East Kesteven Rural District and North Kesteven Rural District, all from the administrative county of Kesteven, which was abolished.

Geography

North Kesteven borders West Lindsey (along the Foss Dyke and the River Witham) and the city of Lincoln to the north, East Lindsey to the north-east (along the River Witham), Boston (borough) to the east, South Holland to the south-east, South Kesteven to the south, and the county of Nottinghamshire to the west.

The district is characterised by small settlements and large areas of arable farmland. More than 80% of the population live in rural settlements or a market town.

The district has two main RAF stations - RAF Cranwell (near Sleaford), and RAF Waddington (near Lincoln), both situated close to the A15, the main north–south road running through North Kesteven. The district is also home to RAF Digby, which lies between Sleaford and Metheringham. The former RAF Swinderby, which can be found adjacent to the A46 near the western edge of the district, closed in 1995.

Demographics

The predominantly rural nature of the district has encouraged people to move to the area to take advantage of its quality of life, low crime rates, relatively low house prices, good-quality education and local heritage.  This is reflected in research, which has shown 90% of residents are satisfied with their local area as a place to live and 82% of residents feel their area is a place where people from different backgrounds can get on well together.

North Kesteven is mostly rural in character but there are urban areas around the towns of North Hykeham and Sleaford. Sleaford forms an urban area with the nearby villages of Greylees, Holdingham, Leasingham and Quarrington, North Hykeham and Waddington form part of an urban area with the city of Lincoln. Within the district, 40% of the population live in the "Lincoln Fringe", the area immediately surrounding Lincoln City. 72 parishes serve the district communities, comprising 58 parish councils, two town councils and 12 parish meetings.

The population of the district was 107,766 at the 2011 census.

Education

The district has comprehensive schools in North Hykeham, Branston and Welbourn. The area around Sleaford (including Ruskington) has selective schools. Other schools in the area include Kesteven and Sleaford High School and Branston Community College.

The district part funds The National Centre for Craft & Design, in the Hub building in Sleaford.  Adjacent to it are annex buildings of Grantham College, funded by the East Midlands LSC.

Council

The council has been under no overall control since the 2019 election. An administrative group comprising the Conservatives and some independent politicians formed. Richard Wright, a Conservative, serves as leader of the council.

Premises
The council is based at the former Kesteven County Council's offices at the corner of Kesteven Street and East Gate in Sleaford.

It was originally planned to have the council offices in Bracebridge Hall on Newark Road in Lincoln, then the base of North Kesteven Rural District. In November 1973, a decision was taken to base it in The Hoplands in Sleaford, the base of East Kesteven Rural District. In January 1974 it was realised that this building was too small for the size needed, and the 81 rooms of Kesteven County Council's headquarters in Sleaford would suit the new council instead. The Hoplands was subsequently demolished for housing.

Arms

References

External links
 Volunteer Centre Services

 
Non-metropolitan districts of Lincolnshire
Local government districts of the East Midlands